System is the fifth studio album by British soul/R&B singer Seal, released on 12 November 2007. In his online blog, Seal described the album as a return to his dance roots and his best album since his debut. However, it is his lowest-selling album to date in the US, selling 155,000 copies in the first year of its release, according to Nielsen SoundScan.

Track listing

Jennifer24

Charts and certifications

Weekly charts

Year-end charts

Certifications

References

External links

Seal (musician) albums
2007 albums
Warner Records albums
Albums produced by Stuart Price